Azumir Luis Casimiro Veríssimo, or just Azumir (born June 7, 1935; died December 2, 2012 in Rio de Janeiro), was a Brazilian professional football player.

Career
He played for several clubs in Brazil, including Madureira Esporte Clube, Bangu Atlético Clube, Clube de Regatas do Flamengo, Botafogo de Futebol e Regatas, Fluminense Football Club and CR Vasco da Gama, before signing for Portuguese Liga side FC Porto. He played for Porto during the Portuguese league of 1961–62, in which he was the top goal-scorer with 23 goals. He also played in Portugal for Desportivo de Beja, Barreirense, Sporting da Covilhã and FC Tirsense.

External links
 Armando Pinto: Azumir:  A propósito do F. C. Porto - Beira-Mar, nas brumas do tempo, Lôngara - Actividade Literária e Memória Alvi-Anil, 19 April 2012.
 FC Barreirense unofficial blog
 Profile on zerozerofootball.com
 

1935 births
2012 deaths
Brazilian footballers
Madureira Esporte Clube players
Bangu Atlético Clube players
CR Flamengo footballers
Botafogo de Futebol e Regatas players
Fluminense FC players
CR Vasco da Gama players
FC Porto players
S.C. Covilhã players
C.D. Beja players
Association football forwards
Footballers from Rio de Janeiro (city)